Iłowo railway station is a railway station at Iłowo-Osada, Działdowo, Warmian-Masurian, Poland. It is served by Koleje Mazowieckie.

References
Station article at kolej.one.pl

Railway stations in Warsaw